Dan Kotowski (born March 24, 1967) was the Illinois State Senator from the 28th district. The 28th district includes all or parts of Arlington Heights, Bartlett, Bloomingdale, Des Plaines, Elk Grove Village, Hanover Park, Hoffman Estates, Park Ridge, Roselle and Schaumburg. He previously represented the 33rd district from 2007-2013 before the 2011 redistricting.

Early life and career
Dan Kotowski attended Loyola Academy and University of Illinois,  earning a degree in Communications, and DePaul University, earning a masters in Fine Arts. He then served as Executive Director of the gun violence prevention organization "Illinois Council Against Handgun Violence"  and as a vice president at the Uhlich Children's Advantage Network.

Political career
Senator Kotowski was first sworn into office in 2007. He currently served as the Chairperson of Appropriations II, Vice Chairperson of Appropriations I and the Sub-Chairperson on both Property Taxes and CLEAR Compliance. His other committee assignments were Criminal Law, Higher Education, Revenue, and the Subcommittee on Tax Credits. In 2011, his expertise and success on budgeting matters had him made chairman of the bipartisan Budgeting for Results commission.

Electoral history

2012 Senate Election
After the 2011 redistricting, Senator Kotowski chose to run in the newly drawn 28th district which includes his home, much of the old 33rd district and added Bartlett, Bloomingdale, Hanover Park, Roselle and Schaumburg. In the election he faced Republican businessman Jim O'Donnell.

2008 Senate Election

2006 Senate Election
In 2006, Dan Kotowski ran for the Senate seat being vacated by the retiring Dave Sullivan.

Post-legislative career
Kotowski resigned his Senate position in 2015 to become CEO of Chicago-based healthcare advocacy/lobbying organization ChildServ to "take care of [his] family better."  In 2018, Gov. J.B. Pritzker appointed Kotowski a member of the gubernatorial transition's Healthy Children and Families Committee.

References

External links
Biography, bills and committees at the 98th Illinois General Assembly
By session: 98th, 97th, 96th, 95th

Illinois state senators
Living people
People from Park Ridge, Illinois
DePaul University alumni
University of Illinois alumni
1967 births
American politicians of Polish descent
21st-century American politicians